The 1932 Swedish Ice Hockey Championship was the 11th season of the Swedish Ice Hockey Championship, the national championship of Sweden. Hammarby IF won the championship.

Tournament

Qualification
 Hammarby IF - Djurgårdshofs IF 8:1
 Karlbergs BK - UoIF Matteuspojkarna 4:0
 IK Hermes - Lilljanshofs IF 2:0
 Nacka SK - Tranebergs IF 3:0
 Södertälje SK - Djurgårdens IF 0:0/2:1
 AIK - IFK Mariefred 9:0
 IK Göta - IFK Stockholm 4:0

Quarterfinals 
 Hammarby IF - Karlbergs BK 3:2
 IK Hermes - Nacka SK 2:1
 Södertälje SK - Södertälje IF 2:0
 AIK - IK Göta 4:1

Semifinals 
 Hammarby IF - IK Hermes 6:3
 Södertälje SK - AIK  1:0 n.V.

Final
 Hammarby IF - Södertälje SK 2:1 n.V.

External links
 Season on hockeyarchives.info

Cham
Swedish Ice Hockey Championship seasons